Maja Savić (born April 29, 1976 in Berane, Montenegro) is a former Montenegrin handball player, playing for ŽRK Budućnost, where she came to from Viborg HK. She plays on the left wing position, and was member of ŽRK Budućnost and Slagelse Dream Team (2004–2008).

Maja Savić played for the national teams of FR Yugoslavia and Serbia and Montenegro. In the 2001 World Women's Handball Championship, where Yugoslavia won bronze, Maja Savić was declared the Best Left Wing of the World and member of All Star Team  At the 2012 Summer Olympics, she was part of the Montenegrin handball team that won the silver medal.

References

1976 births
Living people
People from Berane
Montenegrin female handball players
Viborg HK players
Handball players at the 2012 Summer Olympics
Olympic handball players of Montenegro
Olympic medalists in handball
Olympic silver medalists for Montenegro
Medalists at the 2012 Summer Olympics